Franz Eugen Hammernick, was a Swiss racing driver who completed mainly in Sports Car racing during the 1950s.

Career

His most notable results was a third place in the ADAC-1000 Kilometer-Rennen, taking a class win, when he partnered Adolf Brudes, in a Borgward Hansa 1500 RS. The couple years before, he took a class victory in the 1951 Eifelrennen.

The only other event of note during Hammernick career, was during the 1954 Carrera Panamericana, when as one of the works Borgward drivers, he struck an embankment trying to avoid a dog. He was thrown out of the car and broke his collarbone.

Racing record

Career highlights

Complete Carrera Panamericana results

References

Carrera Panamericana drivers
World Sportscar Championship drivers
Swiss racing drivers